Valerie Anne Bertinelli (born April 23, 1960) is an American actress. She first achieved recognition as an adolescent, portraying Barbara Cooper Royer on the sitcom One Day at a Time (1975–1984), for which she won two Golden Globe Awards for Best Supporting Actress in a Series, Miniseries or Television Film. She subsequently earned adult stardom as Gloria on the religious drama series Touched by an Angel (2001–2003) and Melanie Moretti on the sitcom Hot in Cleveland (2010–2015), the latter of which gained her a Screen Actors Guild Award nomination. In 2012, she was awarded a star on the Hollywood Walk of Fame.

Bertinelli has hosted several programs for Food Network, such as the cooking shows Valerie's Home Cooking (2015–present) and Kids Baking Championship (2015–present), winning two Daytime Emmy Awards for the former out of six nominations. In December 2021, Bertinelli signed a new deal with Food Network. Bertinelli was married to musician Eddie Van Halen from 1981 to 2007, with whom she has one child, Wolfgang. She was married to Tom Vitale from 2011 to 2022.

Early life and education
Bertinelli was born in Wilmington, Delaware to Nancy ( Carvin) and Andrew Bertinelli, a General Motors executive. Her father is of Italian descent and her mother is of English descent. She has three brothers: David, Patrick and Drew. An elder brother, Mark, died at 17 months from accidental poisoning before she was born.

Because of her father's career, the family frequently moved. Over various periods, they lived in Claymont, Delaware; Clarkston, Michigan; Shreveport, Louisiana; Oklahoma City, and the Los Feliz section of Los Angeles, where Bertinelli studied acting at the Tami Lynn School of Artists. She attended Granada Hills Charter High School and was raised Roman Catholic.

Career

Following her appearance in an episode of Apple's Way, Bertinelli was approached by producer Norman Lear to audition for the role of cooperative daughter Barbara Cooper in a new sitcom called One Day at a Time. The show debuted in late 1975 when Bertinelli was 15 years old. She appeared in 208 of the 209 episodes before the show left the air on May 28, 1984; she won two Golden Globe Awards for her performance. In the 2005 One Day at a Time Reunion Special, Bertinelli was reunited with fellow cast members Bonnie Franklin, Mackenzie Phillips and Pat Harrington Jr. to watch memorable clips from the original show's nine seasons. They talked about actors who had left the show as well as Phillips's drug problem, which had wreaked havoc on the set and caused Phillips to be fired from the show.

After the run of One Day at a Time, Bertinelli starred in several made-for-TV films and miniseries, as well as making many guest appearances on various television shows. In the 1990s, she starred in two short-lived sitcoms: Sydney, as the title character, a private detective (with Matthew Perry and Craig Bierko), and Café Americain. In 2001, Bertinelli joined the cast of Touched by an Angel for the show's last two seasons. In 2007, Bertinelli became a spokeswoman for the Jenny Craig program and appeared in several commercials. The following year, she released the autobiography Losing It: And Gaining My Life Back One Pound at a Time, which culminates in a description of her Jenny Craig diet experience. In 2009 she wrote a follow-up book Finding It: And Satisfying My Hunger for Life Without Opening the Fridge. From 2010 to 2015, she starred in the TV Land sitcom Hot in Cleveland, alongside Betty White, Wendie Malick and Jane Leeves. After a successful six-season run, the show's final episode aired on June 3, 2015.

In 2015, Bertinelli began hosting two shows, Valerie's Home Cooking and Kids Baking Championship with cake artist Duff Goldman on the Food Network. She won two Daytime Emmy Awards for her work on Valerie's Home Cooking. In 2019, Bertinelli hosted two other Food Network shows, Family Food Showdown and Family Restaurant Rivals. In June 2021, it was announced that Bertinelli will star opposite Demi Lovato in NBC's single-camera comedy pilot, Hungry. In December 2021, Bertinelli signed a new deal with Food Network. In January 2022, Bertinelli released her memoir Enough Already: Learning to Love the Way I Am Today.

Personal life

Bertinelli married Eddie Van Halen in 1981. They had a son, Wolfgang (born March 16, 1991). Bertinelli is said to have given her only child an elaborate name rather than an Americanized one (e.g. "Bob"). The couple separated in 2001 and divorced on December 20, 2007. In her autobiography, Bertinelli indicated the main reasons for her divorce were her husband's cocaine addiction and his refusal to quit smoking despite being diagnosed with oral cancer and losing one-third of his tongue in the treatment process. After their divorce, Bertinelli and her ex-husband remained amicable, and she was at his bedside when he died.

In May 2010, Bertinelli announced her engagement to financial planner Tom Vitale, with whom she had begun a relationship in 2004. Bertinelli and Vitale were married on January 1, 2011, in Malibu, California, with Bertinelli in a custom-made dress by designer David Meister. She has four step-children through her marriage to Vitale. Both her ex-husband, Eddie Van Halen, and their son, Wolfgang Van Halen, attended the wedding. Bertinelli filed for legal separation from Vitale on November 24, 2021, citing irreconcilable differences. The divorce was finalized on November 22, 2022.

Bertinelli ran in the April 2010 Boston Marathon to benefit the Dana–Farber Cancer Institute, completing it in a time of 5:14:37. In 2014, she appeared on Who Do You Think You Are? and found out that she is descended from King Edward I of England.

Filmography

Awards and nominations
The following is a list of awards and nominations received by Bertinelli. On August 22, 2012, Bertinelli received the 2,476th star on the Hollywood Walk of Fame.

References

Further reading 
 Dye, David. Child and Youth Actors: Filmography of Their Entire Careers, 1914–1985. Jefferson, NC: McFarland & Co., 1988, p. 18.

External links

 
 
 

1960 births
20th-century American actresses
20th-century American women
21st-century American actresses
21st-century American women
Actresses from Wilmington, Delaware
Actresses from California
American child actresses
American film actresses
American people of English descent
American people of Italian descent
American television actresses
American television chefs
Best Supporting Actress Golden Globe (television) winners
Daytime Emmy Award winners
Food Network chefs
Living people
People from Clarkston, Michigan
Chefs from California
Writers from Wilmington, Delaware
Granada Hills Charter High School alumni
People from Los Feliz, Los Angeles
Women autobiographers
Chefs from Los Angeles